Aigani or Egani is a village and Local Community located on the northeastern border of the historical and Administrative Region of Thessaly, Greece. Since Greece's local government reforms of 2011 the Local Community of Aigani is located in the municipal unit of Kato Olympos in the Tempi municipality within the Larissa Regional Unit of Thessaly. The Local Community of Aigani consists of five settlements and has a total of 1,134 inhabitants as of the 2011 census.

Etymology 
Goats and sheep are raised by many in the village and their meat can be found in the village's taverns alongside traditionally made loukaniko, wine, and the tsipouro for which the village is known.

Village of Aigani 
The largest settlement in the community is the eponymous mountain village of Aigani, which has 535 inhabitants. The area has been an active human settlement since at least the middle Byzantine period.
As is typical for Greek mountain villages, Aigani is densely packed with winding, narrow streets. The square is surrounded taverns and shops, and is where many of Aigani's annual festivals and feasts take place. Aigani has sports facilities in the form of basketball, handball, and tennis courts as well as a football pitch which is home to the village's local football club. An outdoor theater constructed in 2016 hosts concerts and plays throughout the summer and serves as a venue for many local and regional summer festivals.

Aigani has several small churches throughout the village, the largest of which is the church of the Birth of the Virgin Mary. At the village's highest peak is the church of the Prophet Elias, with sweeping views of the valley below, the Olympian hills to the north, and Mount Kissavos to the south. One of the most historically important places in Aigani is the church of Saint Athanasios, which lies in a valley just north of the village. The church was built in the 14th century at the latest and is the oldest known church in all of Thessaly. Unfortunately the church is not well preserved and many of the ancient icons and paintings have disappeared or been damaged.

A small road towards the top of Aigani leads south through the mountains towards a monastery devoted to Nicodemus the Agiorite and continues on to the nearby villages of Krania and Rapsani.

Local community of Aigani 
Aigani is a semi-mountainous community with an area of just  that is defined by mountain, farmland, and sea. The quickly growing beach towns of Nea Mesangala and Kastri-Loutro have 498 inhabitants and lie on the sandy beaches formed by the Pineios river delta and are renowned in Greece for their wide dunes; their warm, shallow, and calm waters; and their inexpensive beach bars, taverns, and hotels. Directly below the village of Aigani, along the national road, are the small settlements of Kato Aigani and Papapouli which collectively have 101 inhabitants.

Until the end of the Balkan Wars in 1913, the northern border of Thessaly marked the end of free Greece. Aigani was therefore the final community before entering Ottoman occupied Greece and was known as a safe haven by those fleeing Ottoman persecution. A cement pillar marking this border can still be found on the hill of Prophet Elias in Aigani.

Demographics

See also
Nea Mesangala
Kastri-Loutro
Platamona
Neoi Poroi
Rapsani

Notes

References 

Populated places in Larissa (regional unit)